The 1989 Asian Women's Handball Championship was the second Asian Championship, which was taking place from 21 to 29 August 1989 in Beijing, China.

Standings

Results

Final standing

References
Results

External links
www.asianhandball.com

H
Asian Handball Championships
Asian
H
August 1989 sports events in Asia